Guy Wildenstein (born December 19, 1945) is a French businessman, art dealer, and racehorse owner and breeder.

Early life 
Born in New York City, Guy Wildenstein is the son of Daniel Wildenstein, an art dealer, racehorse owner and breeder in France. His family fled France following the German occupation during World War II to the United States, where Guy was born. He is a member of the Assembly of French Citizens Abroad.

Career 
After his father's death in 2001, Guy Wildenstein assumed managing control of his art business, leaving his brother Alec to concentrate mainly on the horse racing and breeding operations. Alec died in 2008, leaving Guy in charge of both businesses. The size of his share of the family fortune and trusts, estimated from $5 billion to $10 billion, was disputed by his stepmother, Silvia Wildenstein, in 2009.

Among Wildenstein's art businesses is the Wildenstein & Company art gallery in New York City, formerly at 19 East 64th Street.

Criticism 
The BBC programme Fake or Fortune? criticized Guy Wildenstein in June 2011, after the Wildenstein Institute controversially refused to allow the painting Bords de la Seine à Argenteuil into the Monet catalogue raisonné, despite the programme submitting conclusive documentary evidence to prove its authenticity. The programme's presenter, Philip Mould, called for the Wildenstein Institute to be replaced by a committee of scholars for the purpose of adjudicating whether a painting is an original Monet or not.

In July 2011, Guy Wildenstein was charged by the French authorities with concealing art that had been reported as missing or stolen. The police seized 30 artworks from the vault of the Wildenstein Institute, at least 20 of which, including sculptures by the Italian artist Rembrandt Bugatti, two sketches by Edgar Degas and a pastel by Eugène Delacroix, were claimed to have been originally part of the collection of Joseph Reinach. Daniel Wildenstein had acted as executor of the estate of Reinach's daughter in 1972 and had been charged with responsibility for distributing the collection, which was held at the Wildenstein Institute, among the heirs. Wildenstein was heard by a magistrate in October 2016 and denied all charges. At trial in 2017, Wildenstein was cleared of hiding paintings,  the trial judge said that there was a “clear attempt” by Wildenstein and others to hide assets but it was impossible to return a guilty verdict due to shortcomings in the investigation. The prosecutors successfully appealed to the Cour de Cassation, and the case will be rejudged.

In January of 2021 it was announced that Guy Wildenstein and family members will stand again trial for tax fraud charges. They have already been cleared twice previously. This will be France's third attempt to try the case. They are accused of concealing nearly £500 million from French authorities.

Personal life 
Guy Wildenstein is a father of two: his daughter Vanessa manages the family's London gallery, and his son David manages the family's real estate assets.

In 2008, he invested $49.2 million to flip five Plaza Hotel apartments and bought 7 Sutton Place for $32.5 million.

References

External links 

 Interview with Charlie Rose

1945 births
American art dealers
French polo players
French racehorse owners and breeders
American racehorse owners and breeders
20th-century American Jews
Businesspeople from New York City
Living people
Guy
Commandeurs of the Ordre des Arts et des Lettres
Commandeurs of the Légion d'honneur